Hector Osvaldo Jiménez (born November 3, 1988) is an American professional soccer player who plays as a defender for Major League Soccer club Austin FC.

College and amateur career
Hector played two years at Bell Gardens High School from 2004 to 2006 where he established himself as one of the team's leaders and caught the eye of various soccer programs across the country.

Jiménez is a product of the University of California Berkeley where he played between 2006-2010. He was three-time First Team All-Pac-10 (2008–2010), NSCAA Second Team Far West Region, no. 2 on Cal’s all-time assist list, ESPN The Magazine Academic All-District 8 team, NSCAA First Team Far West All-Region and was three-time Second Team Pac-10 All-Academic. During his college years, Jiménez also played with the Bay Area Ambassadors of the National Premier Soccer League.

Professional career

LA Galaxy 
On January 14, 2011, Jiménez was drafted in the second round (34th overall) in the 2011 MLS SuperDraft by Los Angeles Galaxy. He played three seasons with the Galaxy, recording four goals and six assists in 43 appearances while helping the Galaxy win titles in 2011 and 2012.

Columbus Crew SC 
On January 14, 2014, Jiménez was traded to the Columbus Crew for a Second Round 2014 MLS SuperDraft selection (42nd overall) and allocation money.
 He made his club debut on March 8, 2014 in a 3–0 victory over D.C. United. His first goal for the Crew came on April 19, 2014, also against D.C. United. Jiménez's 90th-minute goal earned the Crew a 1–1 draw and would be nominated for MLS AT&T Goal of the Week honors. He went on to appear in both legs of the Crew's playoff series against the New England Revolution.

Jiménez made 23 appearances in 2015, including his 75th professional appearance on May 16 against the San Jose Earthquakes. He notched four assists on the season while playing at four different positions. However, he did not appear in the playoffs as Crew SC made a run to MLS Cup 2015, where they would fall 2–1 to the Portland Timbers.

Jiménez racked up 25 appearances in 2016, playing five different positions. He made his 100th career appearance on July 3, in a 3–2 defeat to Sporting KC. During the 2017 season, Jiménez made 23 appearances for Columbus. However, in 2018, the signing of Milton Valenzuela, a young Designated Player, saw Jiménez's time on the field significantly decrease, with him only making 12 total appearances. However, during the 2019 season Valenzuela suffered a long-term injury which again saw Jiménez seize the starting left back position and he made a total of 23 appearances.

In his last season with Columbus, Jiménez made a total of 10 appearances. One of these appearances was during the 2020 MLS Cup where Columbus beat the Seattle Sounders 3–0. On December 14, 2020, Columbus declined their contract option on Jiménez following their 2020 season ending his time with the club.

Austin FC
On December 21, 2020, Jiménez joined Austin FC as a free agent ahead of their inaugural season in 2021. He made his first start for Austin on May 15 against former club LA Galaxy, but was removed on a stretcher in the first half. His next appearance came on June 24, replacing injured right-back Nick Lima. Jiménez scored the final goal of Austin's 4–1 win over Portland Timbers on July 1, the club's first win at Q2 Stadium.

Career statistics

Club

Personal life
Both of Jiménez's parents are Mexican immigrants, who met in the United States.

Honors
LA Galaxy
MLS Cup: 2011, 2012
Major League Soccer Supporters' Shield: 2011
Major League Soccer Western Conference Championship: 2011, 2012

Columbus Crew SC
MLS Cup: 2020

References

External links
 
 

1988 births
Association football utility players
Living people
American soccer players
American people of Mexican descent
California Golden Bears men's soccer players
LA Galaxy players
Columbus Crew players
Soccer players from California
LA Galaxy draft picks
Major League Soccer players
People from Bell Gardens, California
Association football defenders
Association football midfielders
People from Huntington Park, California
Austin FC players